Enrico Rava Quartet is an album by Italian jazz trumpeter and composer Enrico Rava recorded in 1978 and released on the ECM label.

Reception
The Allmusic review by Brian Olewnick awarded the album 4 stars stating "Recordings like this one are fine introductions to this underappreciated trumpeter's work".

Track listing
All compositions by Enrico Rava except as indicated
 "Lavori Casalinghi" (Enrico Rava, Graciela Rava) - 14:48
 "Fearless Five" - 4:42
 "Tramps" - 15:29
 "'Round About Midnight" (Thelonious Monk) - 3:47
 "Blackmail" - 3:22

Personnel
Enrico Rava - trumpet
Roswell Rudd - trombone
Jean-François Jenny-Clark - bass
Aldo Romano - drums

References

ECM Records albums
Enrico Rava albums
1978 albums
Albums produced by Manfred Eicher